The 2021–22 Montenegrin Cup was the 16th season of the knockout football tournament in Montenegro. This season's cup was started on 27 October 2021. The winners of the cup this season earned a place in the first qualifying round of the 2022–23 UEFA Europa Conference League.

Budućnost was the defending champions from the previous season after defeating Dečić in the final by the score of 3–1.

First round
Draw for the first round was held on 18 October 2021. The matches were played on 27 October 2021.

Summary

|}

Matches

Quarter-finals
Draw for the quarter-finals was held on 15 November 2021. The matches were played on 24 November 2021.

Summary

|}

Matches

Semi-finals
Draw for the semi-finals was held on 11 April 2022. The semi-finals will be played from 20 April to 4 May 2022.

Summary

|}

First legs

Second legs

Final

See also
 Montenegrin Cup
 Montenegrin First League

References

External links
Montenegrin Cup 2021-2022 at Football Association of Montenegro's official site
Montenegrin Cup 2021-2022 at Soccerway

Montenegrin Cup seasons
Montenegro
Cup